Gordon Charles Pearce (born 10 January 1934 in Jabalpur, Madhya Pradesh, India) is an Indian-born Australian field hockey player who competed in the 1956 Summer Olympics, in the 1960 Summer Olympics, and in the 1968 Summer Olympics for Australia.

Pearce is the fourth of five brothers who represented Australia in hockey in the 1950s and 1960s.

In later life Pearce became a senior public servant within the Western Australian Public Service:  In 1987 he was chief executive of the office of the Premier of Western Australia and in 1990 was appointed Chief Executive to the WA Inc Royal Commission by premier Carmen Lawrence. In 1995 he was appointed a member in the general division of the Order of Australia.

He is the grandfather of Australian Kookaburras representative, Jake Harvie.

References

External links
 

1934 births
Living people
Australian male field hockey players
Anglo-Indian people
Australian people of Anglo-Indian descent
Australian sportspeople of Indian descent
Indian emigrants to Australia
Olympic field hockey players of Australia
Field hockey players at the 1956 Summer Olympics
Field hockey players at the 1960 Summer Olympics
Field hockey players at the 1968 Summer Olympics
Olympic silver medalists for Australia
Olympic medalists in field hockey
People from Jabalpur
Public servants of Western Australia
Field hockey players from Madhya Pradesh
Field hockey players from Perth, Western Australia
Medalists at the 1968 Summer Olympics